Kenneth Gleason was an American football player and coach of football and baseball.  He served as the head football coach at Fresno State College—now known as California State University, Fresno—from 1947 to 1948, compiling a record of 6–12–3.  Bradshaw was also the head baseball coach as Fresno state in 1947, tallying a mark of 9–20. A native of Santa Cruz, California, he played college football at Fresno State, lettering as a fullback from 1935 to 1937.  In 1938, Bradshaw was appointed head football coach at Fowler High School in Fowler, California.  During World War II, he served in the United States Navy, playing with the Saint Mary's Pre-Flight Air Devils football team before coaching undefeated football team in 1945 at a naval air station in Hutchinson, Kansas.  He returned to Fresno State in 1946 as an assistant football coach, working under head coach James Bradshaw.

Head coaching record

College football

References

Year of birth missing
Year of death missing
American football fullbacks
Fresno State Bulldogs baseball coaches
Fresno State Bulldogs football coaches
Fresno State Bulldogs football players
Saint Mary's Pre-Flight Air Devils football players
High school football coaches in California
Sportspeople from Santa Cruz, California
Players of American football from California